The Sarra Triangle is a strip of land, today located in the Kufra District of Libya, originally colonised by Britain and added to Anglo-Egyptian Sudan. In 1934 an agreement was struck between the United Kingdom and the Kingdom of Italy, ceding the territory to the Italian colony in Libya. The land is home to a minor oasis called Ma'tan as-Sarra.

References

Kufra District
1930s establishments in Libya
Italy–United Kingdom relations
1934 in Africa
1934 in the Italian Empire
1934 in the British Empire